James Moir may refer to:

 James Moir (executive), BBC executive
 James Moir (soccer) (1900–1961), Canadian soccer player
 James Moir (merchant) (1817–1899), Scottish-American merchant
 Jimmy Moir (footballer) (1879–?), Scottish footballer
 Jim Moir, comedian known by his stage name Vic Reeves
 James Moir, boxer known as Gunner Moir